The Bazaikha is a river in the Krasnoyarsk Krai. It is the third largest river in the Krasnoyarsk neighborhood after Yenisey and Mana. The name derived from the Kamassian  — iron river.

Course
Beginning in the Eastern Sayan mountains it flows west-northward without a contact with populated places until the very confluence with the Yenisey in the suburbs near the southwestern edge of the Krasnoyarsk city. The valley is mostly deep and winding with the banks covered with conifers.

Tourism
Numerous resorts, dachas and cottages are built in the valley stretching for  inwards from the confluence.

The closest approach to the wild part of Bazaikha is from the villages of Beryozovskiy and Magansk.

See also
List of rivers of Russia

References

External links

Fishing in Russia

Rivers of Krasnoyarsk Krai